Parliamentary elections were held in Tajikistan on 27 February 2000, with a second round in 11 of the 41 constituencies on 12 March. The result was a victory for the People's Democratic Party of Tajikistan, which won 36 of the 63 seats. Voter turnout was 93.4%.

Results

References

Tajikistan
Elections in Tajikistan
2000 in Tajikistan
Election and referendum articles with incomplete results